Gary Lawton France (born 15 May 1946) is an English retired footballer who played as a midfielder. He played professionally in the Football League with both Burnley and Bury.

References

1946 births
Living people
People from Stalybridge
English footballers
Association football midfielders
Stalybridge Celtic F.C. players
Burnley F.C. players
Bury F.C. players
English Football League players
Cape Town City F.C. (NFL) players